Tom Hurry Riches (1846–1911) was a British engineer who became the Locomotive Superintendent of the Taff Vale Railway in October 1873, and held the post until his death. At the time of his appointment, he was the youngest locomotive superintendent in Britain.  Riches was elected as a Whitworth Exhibitioner in 1868.

Riches served as President of the Institution of Mechanical Engineers in 1907–1908.

His son, Charles T. Hurry Riches was Locomotive Superintendent of the Rhymney Railway from 1906 until 1922.

References

1846 births
1911 deaths
Engineers from Cardiff
British mechanical engineers
Locomotive builders and designers
Taff Vale Railway